In Greek mythology, Abderus or Abderos (Ancient Greek: Ἄβδηρος) was a divine hero, reputed by some to be one of Heracles' lovers (eromenoi), and reputedly a son of Hermes by some accounts, and eponym of Abdera, Thrace.

Family 
The paternity of Abderus differs according to the sources. Some say he was the son of the god Hermes and a native of Opus in Locris, but according to other writers, he was the son of Thromius the Locrian. Photius writes that he was brother of Patroclus. Pindar makes Abderus a son of Poseidon and Thronia.

Mythology 
Abderus was mostly known for his tragic role in Heracles' Eighth Labor. Along with others, he helped Heracles capture the four savage mares of Diomedes the king of the Thracian Bistones. Heracles overpowered the grooms and drove the Mares of Diomedes into the sea and left them in the care of Abderus. However, while Heracles was away, the horses devoured Abderus. In revenge, Heracles fed Diomedes alive to his own mares. Heracles founded the city of Abdera near Abderus's tomb, where agones, athletic games consisting of boxing, pancratium and wrestling were held in his honor (but chariot races were banned in respect of how he died).

In some very different traditions, instead of helping Heracles with his Eighth Labor, Abderus (or Abdertis) was a servant of Diomedes, and was killed by Heracles together with his master and his four men-devouring horses.

Notes

References
Hyginus, Fabulae from The Myths of Hyginus translated and edited by Mary Grant. University of Kansas Publications in Humanistic Studies. Online version at the Topos Text Project.
Philostratus, Heroica, translation by Jennifer K. Berenson Maclean and Ellen Bradshaw Aitken, Flavius Philostratus: On Heroes, WGRW 3 (Atlanta: Society of Biblical Literature, 2002), XX. Harvard University's Center for Hellenic Studies. Online version at the Topos Text Project.
Philostratus the Elder. Imagines, translated by Arthur Fairbanks (1864-1944). Loeb Classical Library Volume 256. London: William Heinemann, 1931. Online version at the Topos Text Project.
Pseudo-Apollodorus, Apollodorus, The Library, with an English Translation by Sir James George Frazer, F.B.A., F.R.S. in 2 Volumes. Cambridge, Massachusetts, Harvard University Press; London, William Heinemann Ltd. 1921. Online version at the Perseus Digital Library.
Smith, William; Dictionary of Greek and Roman Biography and Mythology, London (1873). "Abde'rus"
Strabo, The Geography of Strabo. Edition by H.L. Jones. Cambridge, Mass.: Harvard University Press; London: William Heinemann, Ltd. 1924. Online version at the Perseus Digital Library.
On the agones: Philostratus II 25.

Greek mythological heroes
Male lovers of Heracles
Children of Hermes
Demigods in classical mythology
Locrian characters in Greek mythology
Mythology of Heracles
Greek mythology of Thrace